List of Witchblade episodes may refer to:

 List of Witchblade (TV series) episodes, a 2001–2002 live action television series which ran on TNT.
 List of Witchblade (anime) episodes, a 2006 animated series which ran on TBS in Japan, IFC in the United States.